Pennsylvania State Senate District 30 includes all of Blair County, Fulton County, Huntingdon County, Juniata County, and Mifflin County. It is currently represented by Republican Judy Ward.

Senators

References

Pennsylvania Senate districts
Government of Blair County, Pennsylvania
Government of Cumberland County, Pennsylvania
Government of Franklin County, Pennsylvania
Government of Fulton County, Pennsylvania
Government of Huntingdon County, Pennsylvania